Issa Abdullah bin Abdulrahman Al-Ghaith is a judge, Islamic scholar, author, and activist. He is a member of the Consultative Assembly of Saudi Arabia and King Abdulaziz Center for National Dialogue. He received a doctor's degree in Sharia and Law College in Al-Azhar University in Cairo, Egypt.

After that, he worked as a lecturer and Professor Assistant in Imam Muhammad ibn Saud Islamic University, College of Shariah, Jurisprudence Department until he was assigned as Member of the Consultative Assembly of Saudi Arabia.

Participated in the discussion and supervision of several Master and doctorate theses in the field of jurisprudence. Al-Ghaith among 500 Most Powerful Muslims List in Islamica Magazine.

Professional experience
 Member, Consultative Assembly of Saudi Arabia.
Member, King Abdulaziz Center for National Dialogue.
 Vice chairman, Board of Grievances.
  Assistant Deputy, an Appellate Judge level, Board of Grievances.
 Member, Audit panel, Board of Grievances.
 Advisor, Court (A) deputy level, Board of Grievances.
 Court Council member, Discipline pane.

References

Living people
21st-century Muslim scholars of Islam
Saudi Arabian Islamists
Saudi Arabian activists
1972 births